The Chief of Staff of the Armed Forces of the Philippines (CSAFP) is the highest-ranking military officer (except for the President of the Philippines, who holds the position of Commander-in-Chief equivalent to a five-star general) and the head of the Armed Forces of the Philippines (AFP), including all service branches (Army, Air Force, Navy–Marine Corps, Coast Guard—in Wartime Attached Service) under its command. The position is usually held by a four-star rank of General or Admiral. Its direct equivalent in the US Armed Forces is the Chairman of the Joint Chiefs of Staff. Unlike its US counterpart, which is merely supervisory, the Chief of Staff has complete operational control and is responsible for the overall operations of the AFP.

The holder of this position is appointed by, as well as directly reports to the President of the Philippines under the Article VII, Section 18 of the 1987 Constitution. He executes the President's commands, tactics, operations, plannings, and strategies, as well as serves as the Immediate Adviser to the Secretary of National Defense. He also prescribes directions to all commands (including the Commanding General of the Philippine Army, the Commanding General of the Philippine Air Force, the Flag Officer-in-Command of the Philippine Navy, the Commanders of the AFP Unified Commands, and the AFP Board of Generals).

The Armed Forces of the Philippines were created as a result of the Commonwealth Act No. 1, also known as the National Defense Act of 1935. However, the origin of the organization can be traced back to the establishment of the Philippine Constabulary, armed Filipino forces organized in 1901 by the United States to combat the Philippine Revolutionary Army then led by General Emilio Aguinaldo.

History
The position of the Chief of Staff has been traced from the Commanding General of the Philippine Army, when the Philippine Commonwealth Army (now the Philippine Army) was established as the main army of the Commonwealth of the Philippines. After the defeat of the First Philippine Republic during the Philippine–American War, the United States dissolved the army and relied on its armed forces together with some Filipino troops under the Philippine Constabulary. However, the National Defense Act of 1935 led to take on responsibilities on national defense and pave way for the creation of three major commands (Army, Air Force, Navy). Since the 1960s, the rosters of the Chiefs of Staff is arranged accordingly.

On June 19, 2020, under the DND Order no. 174, the title of Chief of Staff was renamed as the Chairman of the Joint Chiefs, while the Vice-Chief of Staff as vice-chairman of the Joint Chiefs, and The Deputy Chief of Staff as Chief of the Joint Staff. Although the usage of these titles were deferred.

Organization and term limit
The AFP Chief of Staff is assisted by the Vice-Chief of Staff of the AFP (VCSAFP) and The Deputy Chief of Staff of the AFP (TDCSAFP), both holders of the rank of Lieutenant General/Vice Admiral. The Vice-Chief of Staff serves as the primary assistant of the AFP Chief of Staff in their operational duties, as well as in policy conceptualization and implementation matters in the AFP, and also assists the AFP Chief of Staff in their absence. The Deputy Chief of Staff (TDCS) is tasked to supervise the organizational staff, including the Joint Staff, the Special Staff, the Administrative and the Technical Staff. The Deputy Chief of Staff is also responsible for assisting the AFP's overall policy and strategy formations, and perform other duties assigned by the AFP Chief of Staff. These posts are also assisted by the Secretary Joint Staff (SJS), who serves as the executive officer for the AFP Chief of Staff, the Vice-Chief of Staff, and The Deputy Chief of Staff. The AFP Chief of Staff is also advised on enlisted personnel matters by the Armed Forces of the Philippines Sergeant Major (AFPSM).

The AFP Chief of Staff has no definite or fixed term limit, under Republic Act No. 8186, as the term limit of the AFP Chief of Staff, along with all uniformed members of the AFP, has a mandatory retirement age at 56 years old. Nevertheless, the AFP Chief of Staff's term can be extended and allows a flexible term while serving beyond the mandatory retirement age, as the AFP Chief of Staff can serve their post until 3 years. Plans to reform the current system were made in 2011, but was vetoed by then-President Benigno Aquino III. An updated bill is currently being crafted since 2020, which aims to create a fixed term of 3 years for the AFP Chief of Staff, the Vice-Chief of Staff, The Deputy Chief of Staff, the commanders of the three major services (Army, Navy, Air Force), the commanders of the unified commands (NOLCOM, SOLCOM, WESCOM, CENTCOM, WESTMINCOM, EASTMINCOM), the commandant of the Philippine Marine Corps, the commander of the AFP Special Operations Command, and the commander of the upcoming Cyber Security Command; while the Superintendent of the Philippine Military Academy (PMA) will have a 4-year term in their post, and will not be allowed to be reappointed in other higher posts. The bill also allows the president to remove the sitting AFP chief of staff at his/her pleasure within their 3-year term. Once passed and enacted into law, the new law aims to increase the flexibility, organizational professionalism and effectiveness in their respective roles. On May 16, 2022, former President Rodrigo Duterte signed the Republic Act No. 11709, which serves as the new law that enables a three-year fixed term for key officials of the Armed Forces of the Philippines, including the Chief of Staff of the AFP.

Officeholders

See also
 Chairman of the Joint Chiefs of Staff (Jordan)
 Chairman Joint Chiefs of Staff Committee (Pakistan)
 Chairman of the Joint Chiefs of Staff (United States)

Notes

References

External links 
 
 Reveille: AFP chiefs of staff through the years, Ramon J. Farolan, Philippine Daily Inquirer, January 10, 2010

Filipino military leaders
Armed Forces of the Philippines
Department of National Defense (Philippines)
Philippines